Eristalis hirta, the black-footed drone fly, is a common Western North American species of syrphid fly first officially described by Loew in 1866. Hoverflies get their names from the ability to remain nearly motionless while in flight. The adults are also known as flower flies for they are commonly found around and on flowers, from which they get both energy-giving nectar and protein-rich pollen. The larvae are aquatic filter-feeders of the rat-tailed type.

Distribution
This species is found in Western North America and Northern Europe  where it is found in  raised bogs, ditches and temporary pools.

Description
For terms see Morphology of Diptera

Size Length: . 

Head  
The frons shining black with pile light brownish yellow The face and frons of female is unusually broad. Pile of face light brownish yellow except the facial stripe (tubercle) and the cheeks which are shining black. The antennae are very dark brownish black, The  arista  is slightly plumose basally.The eyes are contiguous only in males.

Thorax
The thorax is dark shining, brownish black with yellowish pile The scutellum is not quite so dark, brownish, shining  The pleurae are covered with pale yellow pile.

 Legs 
The legs are black and yellow: The  front and middle femurs are black with pale yellow apex and hind femure base and apex yellow. The front and hind tibia are black, with  the basal half or more pale yellow and middle tibia mostly pale yellow. The tarsi all black except middle leg basitarsi are yellow.  

Abdomen
The abdomen is  black with yellow bands and spots. The second segment has a  large, sharply marked, yellow orange spots on the sides, widely separated by opaque black medially. There are light yellow posterior marginal bands of the second third and fourth segments are unusually prominent. Segments three and four  are shining black, with yellow bands posteriorly.

Wings 
The wings are hyaline, or very faintly infuscated in the middle and anterior half. The pterostigma (pt) is small. Veination:  spurious vein (sv), looping of R4+5 into r4+5, closed cell r2+3.

References

Further reading
external map
external images of E. hirta

 

Eristalinae
Articles created by Qbugbot
Insects described in 1866